Real Maryland F.C., commonly known as the Real Maryland Monarchs, was an American soccer team based in Rockville, Maryland, United States. Founded in 2007, the team played in the USL Premier Development League (PDL), the fourth tier of the American Soccer Pyramid, in the South Atlantic Division of the Eastern Conference, having voluntarily self-relegated from the USL Second Division at the end of 2010. The team suspended operations after the 2012 season.

From 2009 to 2012, the team played its home games at Roy Lester Stadium on the campus of Richard Montgomery High School. The team's colors are white, gold and black. The team's nickname, the Monarchs or "Los Monarcas", is intended to reflect the state of Maryland's colonial roots under Lords Calvert and Baltimore.

In addition to the professional team, the club fielded a team in the USL's Super-20 League, a league for players 17 to 20 years of age run under the United Soccer Leagues umbrella.  The club also fielded four teams in the USL's Super Y-League, with teams in the U14, U15, U16, and U17 divisions.

History
Real Maryland was launched in July 2007 as an expansion franchise joining the USL Second Division in 2008. The club's majority owner, Victor Moran, named the club Real Maryland because he intended "to create a REAL event, not just a soccer game", and hired former Northern Virginia Royals head coach Silvino Gonzalo to lead his team in its inaugural campaign.

The Monarchs played their first official game on April 20, 2008, a 1–0 loss to the Western Mass Pioneers, but secured their first ever victory the following week with a 2–0 win over the Pittsburgh Riverhounds; the first goal in franchise history was scored by Bill Brindley. Unfortunately, the Monarchs' first season in USL2 was a difficult one, despite the on-field presence of former Salvadoran internationals Dennis Alas and Ronald Cerritos. They secured two more victories in May, 3–2 over the Cleveland City Stars and 2–1 over the Wilmington Hammerheads, but after conceding a last minute goal to lose 2–1 at home to Cleveland on June 8, fell apart thereafter, and by mid-season were already adrift at the bottom of the standings. Head coach Gonzalo was replaced by Antonio Carlos Vieira in July, but he could do nothing to halt the slide. They suffered several embarrassing defeats towards the end of the regular season, losing 4–0 to the Harrisburg City Islanders, 5–2 to the Wilmington Hammerheads, 6–0 to the Richmond Kickers, and 8–0 to the Charlotte Eagles, their worst result of the season. A 1–1 tie with the Pittsburgh Riverhounds on the last day of the regular season did little to brighten the mood at the Maryland Soccer Plex, as the Monarchs finished dead last in the division; to make matters worse, the team was then docked a point by the league for rules infringement, leaving them seven points adrift of their closest rivals, the Bermuda Hogges. Nilson Perez was the team's top scorer in its debut season, with six goals.

In 2010, it was announced that the Monarchs would move from the USL Second Division to the USL Premier Development League (PDL).

In November 2012, the team announced that it was suspending operations for both the PDL team and the youth programs.

Players

2012 roster

Staff
  David Noyes - General Manager
  Silvino Gonzalo - Head Coach
  David Edlow - Assistant Coach
  Val Teixeira - Assistant Coach
  Edward Brown - Assistant/Goalkeeper Coach
  Jordan Friedlander-Tapia  - Assistant U-20s and U-17s

Notable former players

This list of notable former players comprises players who went on to play professional soccer after playing for the team in the Premier Development League, or those who previously played professionally before joining the team.

  Dennis Alas
  David Bulow
  Ronald Cerritos
  Rod Dyachenko
  Gareth Evans
  Brian Levey
  Rey Ángel Martínez
  Nicki Paterson
  Sean Rush
  Israel Sesay
  Mason Trafford

Year-by-year

Head coaches
  Silvino Gonzalo (2008, 2011–2012)
  Antonio Carlos Vieira (2008)
  Anthony Hudson (2009–2010)

Stadium
 Maryland SoccerPlex; Germantown, Maryland (2008)
 Roy Lester Stadium at Richard Montgomery High School; Rockville, Maryland (2009–2012)

Average attendance
Attendance stats are calculated by averaging each team's self-reported home attendances from the historical match archive at here

2009: 608
2010: 798
2011: 923
2012: 1,051

References

External links
Official site
Official PDL site

 
Defunct soccer clubs in Maryland
Association football clubs established in 2007
Soccer clubs in Maryland
USL Second Division teams
2007 establishments in Maryland